Pimentelia may refer to:
 Pimentelia (beetle), a genus of beetles in the family Chrysomelidae
 Pimentelia (plant), a genus of plants in the family Rubiaceae